The Giro di San Marino was an event on the women's elite cycle racing calendar.

Winners

References

Cycle races in Italy
Women's road bicycle races